Ghanwer Ali Khan Isran is a Pakistani politician who has been a member of the Provincial Assembly of Sindh since August 2018.

Political career

He was elected to the Provincial Assembly of Sindh as a candidate of the  Pakistan Peoples Party (PPP) from PS-15 Qambar Shahdadkot-II in the 2018 Sindh provincial election.

References

Living people
Pakistan People's Party MPAs (Sindh)
Year of birth missing (living people)